Pseudomacrochenus is a genus of longhorn beetles in the subfamily Lamiinae, containing the following species:

 Pseudomacrochenus affinis Breuning, 1960
 Pseudomacrochenus albipennis Chiang, 1981
 Pseudomacrochenus antennatus (Gahan, 1894)
 Pseudomacrochenus oberthueri Breuning, 1955
 Pseudomacrochenus spinicollis Breuning, 1949  
 Pseudomacrochenus wusuae He, Liu & Wang, 2017

References

Lamiini
Taxa named by Stephan von Breuning (entomologist)